This is a list of events and openings related to amusement parks that occurred in 2022. These various lists are not exhaustive.

Amusement parks

Opening
Belgium Beverland Maaseik - May 14
China Fantawild Land - July 9
China Fantasy Valley - April 29
China Fantawild Yunnan - TBA
China Hangzhou Bay Sunac Tourism City - TBA
Germany Karls Erlebnis-Dorf Oberhausen - November 22
South Korea Legoland Korea - May 5
U.S. Lost Island Theme Park - June 18
South Korea Lotte World Adventure Busan - Magic Forest - March 31
China Ocean Flower Island Fairyland - TBA
China Oriental Heritage Anyang - TBA
China Oriental Heritage Zhengzhou - TBA
Poland Majaland Warschau - May 1
China Nickelodeon Universe Chongqing - TBA
U.S. Peppa Pig Theme Park Florida - February 24
U.S. Scene75 Entertainment Center Romeoville - August 17
U.S. Sesame Place San Diego - March 26
Vietnam Sun World Hon Thom Nature Park - February 1
Indonesia Transmart Tajur - Bogor - TBA
China Zigong Fantawild Dinosaur Kingdom - June 18

Reopened
U.K. Curry's Fun Park Portrush

Change of name
Ireland Tayto Park » Emerald Park
Malaysia Genting Outdoor Theme Park » Genting SkyWorlds at Resorts World Genting
UAE VR Park Dubai » Play DXB at The Dubai Mall
U.K. Barry's Amusements » Curry's Fun Park Portrush
U.S. SpeedZone Los Angeles » Boomers! Los Angeles

Change of ownership
U.K. Curry's Fun Park Portrush – Trufelli family » Curry family
U.S. Gilroy Gardens – Cedar Fair » Gilroy Gardens, Inc.
Mexico Selva Mágica – Ventura Entertainment » The Dolphin Company
Mexico Selvatica - The Adventure Tribe – Ventura Entertainment » The Dolphin Company
Mexico Ventura Fly & Ride Park – Ventura Entertainment » The Dolphin Company
Mexico Ventura Park – Ventura Entertainment » The Dolphin Company

Birthdays

 Adventureland New York - 60th Birthday
 Phantasialand – 55th Birthday
 Epcot – 40th Birthday 
 Disneyland Paris – 30th Birthday 
 Chessington World of Adventures – 35th Birthday 
 Kentucky Kingdom - 35th Birthday
 Kings Island – 50th Birthday 
 Six Flags Fiesta Texas – 30th birthday 
 Six Flags Over Georgia – 55th birthday 
 Walt Disney Studios Park – 20th birthday 
 La Ronde – 55th birthday 
 Luna Park Melbourne – 110th birthday 
 Mirabilandia – 30th birthday 
 Futuroscope – 35th birthday
 Efteling – 70th birthday 
 Ocean Park Hong Kong – 45th birthday
 Wild Waves Theme Park - 45th birthday

Closed
 Adventure Landing Jacksonville Beach – March 31
 Bosque Mágico – August 28
 Joyland Amusement Park

Additions

Roller coasters

New

Relocated

Refurbished

Other attractions

New

Relocated

Refurbished

Closed attractions & roller coasters

Incidents and accidents
 ICON Park - On 24 March, a 14-year-old boy was killed after falling from the FreeFall drop tower after his harness unlocked during the decent. The decision was made on 6 October to demolish the ride.
 Warner Bros. Movie World - on 5 April, a 12-year old boy was seriously injured after falling from the Looney Tunes Carousel. The boy was sent to the Gold Coast University Hospital with a deep laceration on his head. The ride is currently closed until further notice.
 Six Flags Great America - on 14 August, three people were injured following a drive-by shooting in the parking lot. Two teenagers were taken to Advocate Condell Medical Center in Libertyville; another victim declined transport. The park reopened the following day.
 Six Flags Great Adventure - on 26 August, fourteen people were injured on El Toro. The ride was deemed compromised and has remained closed.
 Kennywood - on 24 September, three people were injured inside the theme park during a fight. A 15-year-old was charged for the incident, but his charges were dismissed in November.
 Disneyland - on 3 December, a 51-year-old man jumped off a parking structure and died.

References

Amusement parks by year
Amusement parks